Ti-Ratana Welfare Society is one of the biggest independent, voluntary, Not-for-profit NGOs based in Kuala Lumpur, Malaysia. It is locally known and registered as "Persatuan Kebajikan Ti-Ratana"; while its Chinese name is 慈愛福利中心.

The society runs three children homes with over 250 children, two seniors' residences with about 50 senior citizens, a shelter home for women, and mobile clinics to provide free medical services to the people in the rural areas.

History
Ti-Ratana Welfare Society was founded by The Most Ven. Datuk K. Sri Dhammaratana and registered on 9 February 1994. The name is a reference to Three Jewels.

In 1996, a three-storey building was acquired through the generosity of a donor and the Ti-Ratana Children's Home was declared open by the National Unity and Social Welfare Minister YB Datuk Paduka Hajjah Zaleha bte Ismail on 21 June 1997.

The Society now located at Salak South Bahru (Desa Petaling), Kuala Lumpur, Malaysia.

Organisation structure
 Founder & Adviser: Most Venerable K. Sri Dhammaratana (current Chief High Priest of Malaysia)
 President: Datuk Seri Dr. KK Chai
 A board of committee members to oversee the operation of Ti-Ratana. The committee members meet frequently to discuss operational tasks, plan activities and determine budgets.
 Volunteers, helpers
 A separate affiliated society, Ti-Ratana Buddhist Society, was set up in 2000 to promote the welfare society along with Humanistic Buddhism

Funding
The society is supported by donations from individuals, corporations and substantial from within Malaysia & surrounding countries.

Activities
 Free medical service for senior citizen/children in rural area
 Free workshops for school children to help them prepare for national examinations (PMR/SPM)
 Annual fund raising charity dinner, family day fun fair, etc.
 Weekly meditation classes at Ti-Ratana Community centre

External links
 
 www.ti-ratana-penchala.com.my Ti-Ratana Penchala Community Center Website
www.trlgpuchong.org Ti-Ratana Buddhist Society (Puchong) Website

Charities based in Malaysia
Educational organisations based in Malaysia
Organisations based in Kuala Lumpur